Douglas Township may refer to one of the following places in the State of Illinois:

Douglas Township, Clark County, Illinois
Douglas Township, Effingham County, Illinois
Douglas Township, Iroquois County, Illinois

See also

Douglas Township (disambiguation)

Illinois township disambiguation pages